Commodore Arvind Singh, MVC, NM was an officer in the Indian Navy notable for his  participation in Operation Pawan, in Sri Lanka as part of the Indian Peace Keeping Force. He displayed exemplary courage and leadership during the conflict. He was awarded the Maha Vir Chakra, India's second highest military decoration and the Nau Sena Medal for gallantry and leadership in different operations.

Military career
Commodore Arvind Singh was a pass out of the Indian Naval Academy, Cochin and was the winner of the president's gold medal for being the best cadet at the passing out parade from the academy. He was also selected for training with US Navy SEALs.

On 21 October 1987, a team of Marine Commandos under then Lt. Arvind Singh's leadership was tasked to destroy Guru Nagar Jetty and speed boats of LTTE militants in the Jaffna Lagoon. In order to destroy additional militant speed boats, the team had to swim over a mile under water. Before the charges could be exploded the team came under heavy firing from the militants, resulting in casualties among the team. In spite of the enemy firing, the team successfully placed and detonated explosive charges and extensively damaged the Jetty and destroyed seventeen LTTE speed boats. For displaying great courage, determination, professionalism and selflessness he was awarded the Maha Vir Chakra.

In 1993, he was tasked with the interdiction and destruction of an LTTE ship off the coast of Madras, which he completed successfully as well. For this mission, he received the Nau Sena Medal (Gallantry).

The decorated Lt. Arvind Singh retired from the Indian Navy with the rank of Commodore.

See also 
 Indian intervention in the Sri Lankan Civil War
 Indian Peace Keeping Force

References

Recipients of the Maha Vir Chakra
Indian Navy officers
Recipients of the Nau Sena Medal